Artyom Andreevich Serikov (born 28 December 2000) is a Russian professional ice hockey defenceman who is currently playing for Khimik Voskresensk in the Supreme Hockey League (VHL) while under contract to HC Spartak Moscow in the Kontinental Hockey League (KHL).

Playing career 

Serikov grew up playing hockey in a sports school in Dmitrov. He made his junior hockey debut in 2017 with the Kapitan Stupino in the Junior Hockey League (MHL), before playing for the Krylya Sovetov Moscow in 2018–19. In 2019, he signed a three-way contract between the MHL, Supreme Hockey League (VHL), and the KHL, splitting his time between the MHK Spartak Moscow (the MHL affiliate of HC Spartak Moscow), Khimik Voskresensk of the VHL, and HC Spartak Moscow of the KHL.

On 3 September 2020, Serikov made his KHL debut for HC Spartak Moscow in an away game against Lokomotiv Yaroslavl. On 3 November 2020, he scored his first KHL goal against HC CSKA Moscow in an overtime win for Spartak. In the 2020–21 KHL season, he recorded three goals and two assists in 41 appearances for Spartak.

On 9 August 2021, the Chicago Wolves of the AHL, the affiliate of the Carolina Hurricanes, signed Serikov to a one-year contract for the 2021–22 AHL season.

On 12 June 2022, Serikov returned to former club, HC Spartak Moscow of the KHL, signing a two-year contract.

Personal life 
Serikov plays football in his spare time. His ice hockey idol is Dmitry Orlov, a defenceman for the Washington Capitals.

Career statistics

References

External links 

 

2000 births
Living people
People from Mytishchi
Chicago Wolves players
Kapitan Stupino players
Krylya Sovetov Moscow players
Norfolk Admirals (ECHL) players
HC Spartak Moscow players
Russian ice hockey defencemen
Sportspeople from Moscow Oblast